Jane Prim Rose (February 7, 1913 – June 29, 1979) was an American character actress, perhaps best remembered as Audrey Dexter, the gently befuddled mother-in-law of Phyllis Lindstrom on the CBS sitcom Phyllis (1975–1977).

Early life
Jane Prim Rose was born on February 7, 1913, in Seattle. She attended the University of Washington, where future actress Frances Farmer was a classmate; Rose and Farmer were subsequently roommates in New York City in 1935.

Career
Rose, who worked with the New York Association for the Blind (she served eleven years as the Association's Director of Recreation), also taught acting, and was a pioneer in the use of drama as therapy for the blind.

She appeared in the original Broadway productions of The Time of the Cuckoo (1952–53), Orpheus Descending (1957),  and
The Gazebo (1958–59), as well as a revival of Bernard Shaw's Heartbreak House (1959–60), in which she played Nurse Guinness. She also performed for the New York Shakespeare Festival in such productions as All's Well That Ends Well, Richard III, and Measure for Measure."

Her films included David Lean's Summertime (1955), with Katharine Hepburn, Flipper (1963), and I Walk the Line (1970), with Gregory Peck and Tuesday Weld. Among her  numerous TV credits  were appearances on such shows as Robert Montgomery Presents,  Car 54, Where Are You?, The Defenders, Route 66, All in the Family, Rhoda, Lou Grant, and Co-Ed Fever. In addition, she was featured on the daytime dramas Love of Life (in which she created the character of Sarah Dale), Dark Shadows, The Secret Storm, and Somerset.

In 1975, Rose was cast as Audrey Dexter, mother-in-law to Phyllis Lindstrom (Cloris Leachman), on Phyllis (1975–77). In 2005 – almost thirty years after Phyllis was cancelled - Rose was nominated for a TV Land Award as "Favorite Mother-in-Law".

Rose's last seen performance was as Mrs. Bulfinch in the ABC miniseries Roots: The Next Generations (1979).

She died of cancer on June 29, 1979, at her home in Studio City, California. She was 66.

Filmography

Film

Television

References

External links

1913 births
1979 deaths
American film actresses
American stage actresses
American television actresses
Actresses from Seattle
20th-century American actresses
Deaths from cancer in California
People from Studio City, Los Angeles